The men's team pursuit was an event at the 1956 Summer Olympics in Melbourne, Australia. There were a total number of 65 participants from 16 nations, due to the Italian team having five riders, instead of four.

Final classification

References

External links
 Official Report

Cycling at the 1956 Summer Olympics
Cycling at the Summer Olympics – Men's team pursuit
Track cycling at the 1956 Summer Olympics